John McTavish, John MacTavish, or variant thereof, may refer to:

People

McTavish 
John McTavish (footballer, born 1885), Scottish footballer
John McTavish (footballer, born 1932), Scottish footballer
John McTavish (politician) (1837–1888), Canadian politician

MacTavish 
 John MacTavish (British Consul) (1787–1852), Scots-Canadian who served as British consul to Maryland

Fictional characters
 Soap MacTavish, John MacTavish, from the videogame series "Call of Duty"